T57 may refer to:

 T57 (album), a 2007 album by American gospel group Trin-i-tee 5:7
 Garland/DFW Heloplex (FAA airport code T57), a heliport in Garland, Texas
 T57 Motor Gun Carriage, a proposed WWII variant of the M3 Stuart light tank
 T57 heavy tank, a 1951 experimental American heavy tank
 Jiabao T57, a Chinese truck
 Pratt & Whitney T57, an early turboprop engine
 Slingsby T.57, a replica Sopwith Camel biplane
 T57 (classification), a disability classification for parasport 
 T57 (road), one of the trunk roads in Ireland

See also

 Type 57 (disambiguation)
 57 (disambiguation)